Gheorghe Cantacuzino-Grănicerul was a Romanian landowner, general and far-right politician who was a member of the Iron Guard, and a member of the Legionary Senate.

Biography
Gheorghe Cantacuzino was born in Paris as the son of engineer I.G. Cantacuzino, a descendant of Prince Șerban Cantacuzino. He studied at the Romanian high school in Fontenay-aux-Roses until 1881 and at the "Saint George" High School in France. In 1883 he entered the Military School in Craiova, and starting with 1890 at the Infantry School in Bucharest.

Military career
In 1892, Cantacuzino became a second lieutenant and was attached to a mountain troops unit. Later in 1910 he was promoted to the rank of major and appointed chief of staff of the Minister of War, Nicolae Filipescu. He participated in the Second Balkan War in 1913 and was promoted to the rank of lieutenant-colonel in 1914.

At the beginning of the First World War he was commander of the 1st Regiment of Border Guards from Predeal, with which he occupied the city of Brașov, one of the first victories since the beginning of the war. During the retreat of the Romanian troops in front of the offensive of the Central Powers soldiers, he participated in the battles on the Prahova Valley, from the Rucăr-Bran Pass and then on the front from the Argeș Mountains to the river Olt. Wounded by a shell, Cantacuzino returned to command the regiment after recovery. Cantacuzino was promoted to the rank of colonel and later to the rank of general. He was decorated with the Order of Michael the Brave, 3rd class, for the way he led the Border Guard Brigade in the 1916 campaign. "For the bravery and worth shown on the battlefield in the Carpathians." from the High Decree no. 2990 of October 1, 1916, page 55. 

In 1917 he commanded the Border Guard Brigade from Târgu Ocna and participated, under the command of General Alexandru Averescu , in the battles on the Oituz Valley, ensuring the stabilization of the front in this region. After the armistice, the border guard brigade was moved to Iași. In December 1918, after the signing of the Treaty of Bucharest, he resigned from the army considering that the treaty was incompatible with the honor of soldier. He was transferred to the reserve with the rank of general. In 1915 he sold one of his estates in Vâlcea County to buy 15 modern machine guns with which he endowed the regiment.

French General Henri Berthelot, the head of the French Military Mission during the First World War, characterized Gheorghe Cantacuzino as follows: "He is a man whom you must imprison in time of peace and release in time of war."

Instead, the politician Constantin Argetoianu characterized him caustically: "Poor Zizi was a joke all his life and so he will die, but not on the front but in his bed."

Civil career
Gheorghe Cantacuzino was appointed administrator of civil hospitals and was elected deputy of Vâlcea from the People's Party led by Alexandru Averescu in 1920 and, later, was deputy of Tulcea for the Progressive Conservative Party for both 1922 and 1926.

On December 10, 1934, Corneliu Zelea Codreanu appointed him president of the nationalist party Totul pentru Țară, the successor of the Iron Guard, after outlawing the latter, the de facto leader being Codreanu himself.

Gheorghe Cantacuzino led the group of Legionnaires, in 1936 and went to fight in the Spanish Civil War on the Nationalist faction. After a short stay in Spain, he returned to Romania in the same year, leaving only the rest of the group on the front.

Gheorghe Cantacuzino was married to Elena Kalinderu and was the owner of the building in Imprimeriei Street, no. 3 (later Gutenberg Street). In 1937 he ceded a portion of the land for the construction of the Totul pentru Țară party headquarters, a building built by the voluntary work of the legionaries and known as the "Green House".

His house, located in a protected area, was demolished in May 2010 , despite the request to classify the building as a historical monument, due to the dysfunctions between the Culture Department of Bucharest, the National Commission of Historical Monuments, and the Ministry of Culture and Prefecture. 

Gheorghe Cantacuzino was Gheorghe Manu's uncle.

References

1869 births
1937 deaths
Military personnel from Paris
Romanian Land Forces generals
Romanian Army World War I generals
Romanian military personnel of the Second Balkan War
Members of the Iron Guard